Girinimbine is a carbazole alkaloid isolated from the curry tree (Murraya koenigii) along with the related alkaloids mahanimbine, koenimbine, isomahanine, mahanine, and others.

A 2011 study of girinimbine found that it inhibited the growth and induced apoptosis in human hepatocellular carcinoma, HepG2 cells in vitro.

References 

Alkaloids found in Rutaceae
Carbazoles